Tiny in Swingville is an album by guitarist Tiny Grimes with saxophonist Jerome Richardson recorded in 1959 and released on the Swingville label.

Reception
The Allmusic site awarded the album 4½ stars stating "it really puts the focus on Grimes' bluish but swinging guitar playing".

Track listing 
All compositions by Doretta Crawley and Tiny Grimes except where noted
 "Annie Laurie" (Alicia Scott) - 6:57  
 "Home Sick" - 8:54  
 "Frankie and Johnny" (Traditional) - 3:50  
 "Down With It" - 8:58  
 "Ain't Misbehavin'" (Harry Brooks, Andy Razaf, Fats Waller) - 7:05  
 "Durn Tootin'" (Grimes) - 4:28

Personnel 
Tiny Grimes - guitar
Jerome Richardson - tenor saxophone, baritone saxophone, flute
Ray Bryant - piano
Wendell Marshall - bass
Art Taylor - drums

References 

Tiny Grimes albums
1959 albums
Albums recorded at Van Gelder Studio
Swingville Records albums
Albums produced by Esmond Edwards